Donkey Skin (also known in English as Once Upon a Time and The Magic Donkey) is a 1970 French musical fantasy comedy film directed by Jacques Demy, based on Donkeyskin, a fairy tale by Charles Perrault about a king who wishes to marry his daughter. It stars Catherine Deneuve and Jean Marais, with music by Michel Legrand. Donkey Skin proved to be Demy's biggest success in France, with a total of 2,198,576 tickets sold.

Donkey Skin is distributed on DVD in North America by Koch-Lorber Films. It is also available in Blu-ray format as part of Criterion's The Essential Jacques Demy collection.

In France, the film is considered a cult classic.

Plot
The king promises his dying queen that after her death he will only marry a woman as beautiful and virtuous as she. Pressed by his advisers to remarry and produce an heir, he comes to the conclusion that the only way to fulfill his promise is to marry his own daughter, the princess. Following the advice of her godmother, the lilac fairy, the princess demands a series of seemingly impossible nuptial gifts in the hope that her father will be forced to give up his plans of marriage. However, the king succeeds in providing her with dresses the colour of the weather, the moon and the sun and finally with the skin of a magic donkey that excretes jewels, the source of his kingdom's wealth. Donning the donkey skin, the princess flees her father's kingdom to avoid the incestuous marriage.

In the guise of "Donkey Skin", the princess finds employment as a pig keeper in a neighbouring kingdom. The prince of this kingdom spies her in her hut in the woods and falls in love with her. Love-struck, he retires to his sickbed, and asks that Donkey Skin be instructed to bake him a cake to restore him to health. In the cake, he finds a ring that the princess has placed there, and is thus sure that his love for her is reciprocated. He declares that he will marry the woman whose finger fits the ring.

All the women of marriageable age assemble at the prince's castle and try on the ring one by one, in order of social status. Last of all is the lowly Donkey Skin, who is revealed to be the princess when the ring fits her finger. At the wedding of the prince and the princess, the lilac fairy and the king arrive by helicopter and declare that they too are to be married.

Cast
 Catherine Deneuve as la première reine (the first queen), la princesse (the princess), "Peau d'âne"
 Jean Marais as le premier roi (the first king)
 Jacques Perrin as le prince charmant (the prince)
 Micheline Presle as la reine rouge (the red queen), la seconde reine (the second queen)
 Delphine Seyrig as la fée des lilas (the Lilac fairy)
 Fernand Ledoux as le roi rouge (the red king), le second roi (the second king)
 Henri Crémieux as le chef des médecins (the doctor)
 Sacha Pitoëff as le premier ministre (the prime minister)
 Pierre Repp as Thibaud
 Jean Servais as narrator
 Georges Adet as le savant (the scholar)
 Annick Berger as Nicolette
 Romain Bouteille as le charlatan (the charlatan)
 Louise Chevalier as la vieille (the old woman)
 Sylvain Corthay as Godefroy
 Jacques Demy and Michel Legrand as voices
 Rufus

Production
Jacques Demy, fascinated by Charles Perrault's fairy tale since childhood, was working on a script for the film as early as 1962. The involvement of Catherine Deneuve was instrumental in securing financing for the production.

Numerous elements in the film refer to Jean Cocteau's 1946 fairy-tale film Beauty and the Beast: the casting of Jean Marais, the use of live actors to portray human statues in the castles and the use of simple special effects such as slow motion and reverse motion.

Shooting locations for the film included:
 Château de Chambord
 Château de Pierrefonds
 Château du Plessis-Bourré
 Senlis

Reception
The film sold 2,882,018 tickets in France, making it the ninth-most popular film of 1970.

References

External links
 
 
 
 Donkey Skin: Demy's Fairy-Tale Worlds, an essay by Anne E. Duggan at the Criterion Collection

1970 films
1970 comedy films
1970s fantasy comedy films
1970s musical comedy films
1970s musical fantasy films
Films about royalty
Films based on fairy tales
Films based on works by Charles Perrault
Films directed by Jacques Demy
Films scored by Michel Legrand
Films set in Europe
Films shot in France
French fantasy comedy films
1970s French-language films
French musical comedy films
French musical fantasy films
1970s French films